Sir Martin Wyatt Holdgate  (born 14 January 1931 in Horsham, England) is an English biologist and environmental scientist.

Early life
Holdgate was born in Horsham, England on 14 January 1931, grew up in Blackpool, and was educated at Arnold School. He then attended Cambridge University as an undergraduate at Queens' College, Cambridge from 1949, graduating in 1952 with degrees in zoology and botany and, subsequently, a doctorate in insect physiology.

Career 

He taught at Manchester University, Durham University and Cambridge, as well as undertaking expeditions to Tristan da Cunha, south-west Chile and the Antarctic. He was Chief Biologist to the British Antarctic Survey, then research director of the Nature Conservancy Council and, for eighteen years, Chief Scientist and head of research at the Department of the Environment. Subsequently, he was Director General of the International Union for Conservation of Nature.

After his formal retirement, he was a member of the Royal Commission on Environmental Pollution and served as co-chair of the Intergovernmental Panel on Forests, and Secretary of the UN Secretary General's High-Level Board on Sustainable Development.

Awards and honours

Holdgate has received numerous awards and honours for his work.

 
 
 
 
 
 
 
 
 
 
 
 
 
 
 

Holdgate has been President of the Zoological Society of London and of the Freshwater Biological Association. He is also a member and fellow of the Institute of Biology, making him a Chartered Biologist, and entitling him to use the designations C.Biol and F.I.Biol. In July 2014, he was appointed President of Friends of the Lake District.

Publications

Holdgate edited the journal Antarctic Ecology (published for the Scientific Committee on Antarctic Research, by the Academic Press) from the first edition in 1970. His publications include the following:

As editor 
  (joint editor)

References

External links
Biographical entry at UNEP Global 500 Forum
Career summary from Debretts

1931 births
Living people
People educated at Arnold School
Academics of Durham University
People from Horsham
Alumni of Queens' College, Cambridge
Companions of the Order of the Bath
Environmental scientists
Knights Bachelor
Presidents of the Zoological Society of London
People associated with the International Union for Conservation of Nature
British Antarctic Survey
People from Blackpool
British civil servants
British entomologists
Fellows of Queens' College, Cambridge